Vice Admiral Jack Percival Scatchard  & Two Bars (5 September 1910 – 22 June 2001) was a senior officer in the Royal Navy. He served for a time as Flag Officer Second-in-Command of the Far East Fleet.

Naval career
Educated at Aysgarth School in Yorkshire and the Royal Naval College Dartmouth, Scatchard joined the Royal Navy in 1923. He fought in World War II initially as First Lieutenant in the destroyer  until it was bombed and sunk on 23 May 1941. He went on to command the destroyer  and then, from late in 1943, the destroyer . He served with distinction and was awarded the Distinguished Service Cross & two Bars.

After the War Scatchard became Executive Officer of RNAS Easthaven and was then appointed First Lieutenant of the battleship HMS Vanguard in September 1946. He went on to serve in the Plans Division of the Admiralty, as Captain (D) Portsmouth and as then as Chief Officer (Administration) to the Commander-in-Chief, Portsmouth. After attending the Imperial Defence College, he was appointed Captain 5th Destroyer Squadron in 1957. He became Director of Naval Equipment at the Admiralty in 1958 and Commandant of the Joint Service Defence College in 1960. He went on to be Flag Officer Second-in-Command of the Far East Fleet in 1962 and retired in 1964.

Family
In 1943 Scatchard married Margaret Niven: they had one daughter.

References

Royal Navy admirals
1910 births
2001 deaths
Companions of the Order of the Bath
Recipients of the Distinguished Service Cross (United Kingdom)
People educated at Aysgarth School